was a prolific Japanese manga writer (gensakusha), novelist, screenwriter, lyricist and entrepreneur. He is best known for his violent, artful seinen manga, notably Lone Wolf and Cub (with Goseki Kojima, 1970–6), Lady Snowblood (with Kazuo Kamimura, 1972–3) and Crying Freeman (with Ryoichi Ikegami, 1986–8), which – along with their numerous media adaptations − have been credited for their influence on the international growth of Japanese popular culture.

Career
Early in Koike's career, he studied under Takao Saito (the creator of Golgo 13), and served as a writer on the series.

Koike, along with artist Goseki Kojima, made the manga Kozure Okami (Lone Wolf and Cub), and Koike also contributed to the scripts for the 1970s film adaptations of the series, which starred famous Japanese actor Tomisaburo Wakayama. In 1992 he himself produced a Lone Wolf and Cub's film Lone Wolf and Cub: Final Conflict which starred Masakazu Tamura. Koike and Kojima became known as the "Golden Duo" because of the success of Lone Wolf and Cub.

Another series written by Koike, Crying Freeman, which was illustrated by Ryoichi Ikegami, was adapted into a 1995 live-action film by French director Christophe Gans. In addition to his more violent, action-oriented manga, Koike, an avid golfer, has also written golf manga. He has also written mahjong manga, as he himself is a former professional mahjong player.

In the early 2000s, he wrote a Wolverine story for Marvel. In 2011, Koike announced his intention to write a magical girl manga series titled Maho Shojo Mimitsuki Mimi no QED.

Koike started the Gekiga Sonjuku, a college course meant to teach people how to be a manga artist.

Death
On April 17, 2019, Kazuo Koike died due to pneumonia at the age of 82. His death happened just five days after the death of the fellow prolific manga author Monkey Punch on April 11, who also died of pneumonia and who Koike considered his rival in the Weekly Manga Action magazine.

Graduates of Koike's Gekiga Sonjuku 
 Rumiko Takahashi – manga artist: Urusei Yatsura, Ranma ½, InuYasha etc.
 Akira Sakuma – game designer, freelance writer: Momotaro Densetsu series
 Hideyuki Kikuchi – horror writer: Vampire Hunter D
 Tetsuo Hara – manga artist: Fist of the North Star
 Yuji Horii – game designer, freelance writer: Dragon Quest series
 Keisuke Itagaki – manga artist: Baki the Grappler
 Naoki Yamamoto – manga artist: Dance till Tomorrow
 Takayuki Yamaguchi – manga artist: Apocalypse Zero and Shigurui.

Bibliography 
 Lone Wolf and Cub, with artist Goseki Kojima, 1970–1976
 Hulk: The Manga, with artist Yoshihiro Morifuji, November 24, 1970 – January 6, 1971
 Lady Snowblood, with artist Kazuo Kamimura, 1972–1973
 Samurai Executioner, with artist Goseki Kojima, 1972–1976
 The script to the film Lady Snowblood, 1973
 Adolescent Zoo, with artist Hiromi Yamasaki, 1978–1981
 Nijitte Monogatari, with artist , 1978–2003
 Path of the Assassin, with artist Goseki Kojima, 1978–1984
 Hanappe Bazooka, with artist Go Nagai, June 7, 1979 – January 7, 1982
 Wounded Man, with artist Ryoichi Ikegami, 1983–1986
 Mad Bull 34, with artist Noriyoshi Inoue, 1985–1991
 Crying Freeman, with artist Ryoichi Ikegami, 1986–1988
 Kawaite sōrō, with artist Goseki Kojima, 1995–1999
 X-Men Unlimited #50, 2003
 Kajō, with artist Hideki Mori, 2003–2006
 New Lone Wolf and Cub (Shin Kozure Okami), with artist Hideki Mori, 2003–2006
 Yume Genji Tsurugi no Saimon, with artist Natsuki Sumeragi, 2006–?
 Shura Yukihime Gaiden, with artist Ryoichi Ikegami, 2009–?
 Oda Nobunaga, with artist Goseki Kojima, ?-?
 Offered, with artist Ryoichi Ikegami, ?-?
 Color of Rage, with artist Seisaku Kano, ?-?
 Goyokiba, with artist Takeshi Kanda, ?-?

Awards
 2004: Won the Hall of Fame Eisner Award

Notes

References

External links
 
 
 Macias, Patrick (June 2008). . Manga Hell! Archived via the Wayback Machine. Retrieved October 3, 2013.

 
1936 births
2019 deaths
People from Daisen, Akita
Writers from Akita Prefecture
Will Eisner Award Hall of Fame inductees
Manga writers
Gekiga creators